Dichocrocis clytusalis, the kurrajong bag moth, is a species of moth of the family Crambidae. It is known from the north-eastern half of Australia.

The wingspan is about 20 mm. Adults are bright yellow, with black zig-zag lines across the wings, and a prominent black spot near the middle of each forewing.

The larvae feed on Brachychiton rupestre, Brachychiton acerifolium and Brachychiton populneus. They only eat the soft green parts of a leaf, leaving a skeleton of veins. They are green with sparse hairs and some brown markings and can reach a length of about 20 mm when full-grown. They live communally in a bag formed by rolling up leaves of their food plant and joining them with silk. They hide in the bag by day, emerging to feed at night.

References

External links
 CSIRO Ecosystem Sciences - Australian moths Online 

Moths described in 1859
Spilomelinae